Toney Freeman (born August 30, 1966) is an American IFBB professional bodybuilder and brand ambassador residing in Atlanta, Georgia.

Biography
Freeman's nickname is The X-Man because his body characterizes the "X-frame" of classical bodybuilding: broad shoulders, narrow waist, and flaring thighs. He has been featured on the cover and pages of Flex, Muscular Development, and Musclemag. Freeman did not become a competitive bodybuilder until his late 30s because, for many years, it was a hobby and the sport was dominated by his idols Lee Haney and Dorian Yates.

It took Freeman many years to fill out his large frame and he was mentored by Dave Palumbo to become a professional. Freeman's first (National Physique Committee (NPC)) competition was in 1993, where he won the heavyweight class of the NPC Junior Nationals. His first IFBB event was the Night of Champions competition, where he placed 11th. His first Arnold Classic was in 2005, where he placed 10th. His first Ironman Pro Invitational was in 2006, where he placed 7th. His first Mr. Olympia appearance was in 2006, where he placed 7th. In 2007, he won the Ironman Pro and Sacramento Pro and placed 3rd at the Arnold Classic. He made the top 5 at the 2008 Mr. Olympia.

On December 8, 2010, during a visit to Sweden, Freeman was escorted by the police from Sundsvall while undertaking a promotional appearance in a local store. The police knew Freeman and other international bodybuilders were coming to Sweden for a fitness festival from promotional posters. According to Freeman, he was taken to the police station and was denied a legal representative and forced to give a urine sample. Reports allege that Freeman tested positive for testosterone, human growth hormone, and cannabis. He was released the same day with no charge. On December 31, 2010, Freeman responded to the allegations with an official statement and a video in which he emphasized he had not been treated properly by being denied an advocate or communication with the U.S. embassy.

Freeman became the first international professional bodybuilder to be detained by the Swedish police under "muscle profiling", a profiling method used by Swedish police in which suspicion of performance-enhancing drug use is based solely on physical appearance.  The possession of such substances as steroids is illegal in Sweden. According to others who have been detained in this manner, police use the size and appearance of the bodybuilder to detain them, then aim to prove their case with blood or urine samples taken at the station. Police staff member Henrik Blusi generalized the actions taken against Freeman to all professional bodybuilders, saying: "If you are a professional bodybuilder you should not come to Sundsvall. We are very well informed here. We are currently conducting the largest doping trial in Europe, and then one should understand that we have an eye out for these things now."

Stats
Height:  
Contest Weight: 
Off Season Weight: 
Waist: 32 in (79 cm)

Competitive history
 1990 AAU Junior Mr America, Tall, 4th
 1993 NPC Junior Nationals, Heavyweight, 1st
 1993 NPC Nationals, Heavyweight, 6th
 1994 NPC Nationals, Heavyweight, 4th
 1995 NPC Nationals, Heavyweight, 4th
 2001 NPC Coastal USA Championships, Super-Heavyweight, 2nd
 2001 NPC Nationals, Super-Heavyweight, 8th
 2002 NPC Nationals, Super-Heavyweight, 1st and Overall
 2003 IFBB Night of Champions, 11th
 2003 IFBB Show of Strength Pro Championship, 9th
 2004 IFBB Night of Champions, 10th
 2004 IFBB Show of Strength Pro Championship, 8th
 2005 IFBB Arnold Classic, 10th
 2006 IFBB Arnold Classic, 9th
 2006 IFBB Ironman Pro Invitational, 7th
 2006 IFBB San Francisco Pro Invitational, 5th
 2006 IFBB Europa Super Show, 1st
 2006 IFBB Mr. Olympia, 7th
 2007 IFBB Ironman Pro Invitational, 1st
 2007 IFBB Sacramento Pro, 1st
 2007 IFBB Arnold Classic, 3rd
 2007 IFBB Mr. Olympia, 14th
 2008 IFBB Ironman Pro Invitational, 8th
 2008 IFBB Arnold Classic, 7th
 2008 IFBB Australian Pro Grand Prix, 4th
 2008 IFBB Tampa Bay Pro, 1st
 2008 IFBB Europa Super Show, 1st
 2008 IFBB Mr. Olympia, 5th
 2009 IFBB Arnold Classic, 4th
 2009 IFBB Australian Pro, 3rd
 2009 IFBB Mr. Olympia, 8th
 2010 IFBB Mr. Olympia, 9th
 2010 IFBB Phoenix Pro, 3rd
 2011 IFBB Arnold Classic, 9th
 2011 IFBB British Grand Prix, 6th
 2011 IFBB Mr Europe Grand Prix, 5th
 2011 IFBB Hartford Europa Battle of Champions, 6th
 2011 IFBB Europa Super Show (Dallas), 1st
 2011 IFBB Mr. Olympia, 7th
 2012 IFBB Arnold Classic Europe, 5th
 2012 IFBB Mr. Olympia, 7th
 2013 IFBB Arnold Classic, 3rd
 2013 IFBB Mr. Olympia, 15th

See also

 List of male professional bodybuilders

References

African-American bodybuilders
Professional bodybuilders
1966 births
Living people
21st-century African-American people
20th-century African-American sportspeople